Gold in a Brass Age is the eleventh studio album by English musician David Gray. It was released on 8 March 2019 under IHT Records.

Track listing

Charts

References

2019 albums
David Gray (musician) albums
IHT Records albums